Kabanovo is a rural locality (a selo) and the administrative center of Kabanovsky Selsoviet, Ust-Kalmansky District, Altai Krai, Russia. The population was 650 as of 2013. There are 9 streets.

Geography 
Kabanovo is located 24 km southwest of Ust-Kalmanka (the district's administrative centre) by road. Ust-Kamyshenka is the nearest rural locality.

References 

Rural localities in Ust-Kalmansky District